Stefan Yuryevich Nemirovski (born 29 July 1973) is a Russian mathematician. He made notable contributions to topology and complex analysis, and was awarded an EMS Prize in 2000.

Nemirovski earned his Ph.D. from Moscow State University in 1998.

References

External links
EMS Prize Laudatio, Notices AMS
Website at the University of Bochum

1973 births
Living people
Russian mathematicians